Exceptia is a genus of moths in the family Gelechiidae.

Species
 Exceptia neopetrella (Keifer, 1936)
 Exceptia hospita Povolný, 1989
 Exceptia sisterina Powell & Povolný, 2001

References

Gnorimoschemini